A Z-drive is a type of marine propulsion unit. Specifically, it is an azimuth thruster. The pod can rotate 360 degrees allowing for rapid changes in thrust direction and thus vessel direction. This eliminates the need for a conventional rudder.

The Z-drive is so named because of the appearance (in cross section) of the mechanical driveshaft or transmission configuration used to connect the mechanically supplied driving energy to the Z-drive azimuth thruster device. This form of power transmission is called a Z-drive because the rotary motion has to make two right angle turns, thus resembling the letter "Z". This name is used to differentiate the arrangement of drive to that of the L-drive. It does not refer to an electric motor in a rotating pod.

The device is different from the Voith-Schneider marine propulsion system (also mechanically linked), which can also quickly change the direction of thrust, as the Z-drive uses a shrouded conventional screw that pivots or rotates the propeller, unlike the variable-geometry blades of the Voith-Schneider.

Origins
The Z-drive transmission was invented in 1950 by Joseph Becker, the founder of Schottel, and used in the first azimuth thrusters built by Schottel GmbH in Germany in the 1960s under the Schottel brand name and referred to as RudderPropeller ever since. Joseph Becker was awarded the Elmer A. Sperry Award for this invention as a major contribution to the improvement of transportation worldwide.

Types
Counter-rotating
Integrally installed/hull installation
Deck mounted outboard
Retractable

Applications
 
 
  (coasters)
 
 
 
 
 
 
 
 
 
 s

See also
 , a Z-drive with fixed azimuth, for sailboats

References

External links
Pleuger L- and Z-drive
RudderPropeller

Marine propulsion